Pilina is an extinct genus of paleozoic monoplacophorans in the family Tryblidiidae.

Species
Species in the genus Pilina include:
 Pilina acuminatum Perner (in Koken & Perner), 1925
 Pilina cheyennica Peel, 1977 - from Ordovician in the Keel Member in Oklahoma
 Pilina esthonum (Koken, 1897) - synonym: Triblidium esthonum
 Pilina ovoideum Perner (in Koken & Perner), 1925
 Pilina solarium (Lindström, 1884) - synonym: Palaeacmaea solarium
 Pilina unguis (Lindström, 1880) - synonym: Tryblidium unguis

References

Prehistoric monoplacophorans
Prehistoric mollusc genera